Liběšice is a municipality and village in Louny District in the Ústí nad Labem Region of the Czech Republic. It has about 800 inhabitants.

Administrative parts
Villages of Dobříčany, Dubčany, Kluček, Lhota and Líčkov are administrative parts of Liběšice.

Notable people
Oskar Brázda (1887–1977), painter; lived in Líčkov from 1925 and died there

References

Villages in Louny District